Harmaja is the debut album by Finnish acoustic rock band Harmaja. It was released on 18 February 2009 in Finland through Wiima.

Track listing

 Vajoan – 4:57
 Sydäntalvella – 3:39
 Sataa – 3:59
 Palavana – 4:36
 Kevät – 5:12
 Piiloistaan laulaa – 5:36
 Alla – 4:28
 Taivaan pirstaleet – 4:16
 Varjoina – 8:22

Personnel
 Juha-Pekka Leppäluoto — lead vocals, guitar, Rhodes
 Sami Lauttanen — guitar
 Simo Vuorela — guitar
 Matti "Joki-Matti" Tulinen — bass
 Paula Präktig — piano, vocals, Rhodes
 Riku Kovalainen — drums

2009 debut albums